Tugurt, also known as Oued Righ Berber and Temacine Tamazight, is a Zenati Berber variety spoken in some of the oases of the northeastern Oued Righ region around Touggourt in Algeria. , its main speech area was in Temacine, Blidet-Amor, Meggarine and Ghomra. It is closely related to the nearby Tumzabt (Mozabite) and Teggargrent (Ouargli) languages.

References

Berber languages
Languages of Algeria